Spivey may refer to:

People

Bill Spivey (1929–1995), American basketball player
Dan Spivey (born 1952), American professional wrestler
Dorin Spivey, American boxer
Emily Spivey (born 1971), American television writer and producer
Gary Spivey (contemporary), American psychic
Jim Spivey (born 1960), American middle distance runner and Olympian
Junior Spivey (born 1975), American professional baseball player
Michael Spivey (born 1960), British computer scientist
Mike Spivey (American football) (born 1954), American football player
Mike Spivey (law school administration) (born 1972), American legal academic
Nigel Spivey (born 1958), British professor of classical art and archaeology
Victoria Spivey (1906–1976), American blues singer
Luke John Spivey (born 1999), Technical Design Engineer

Places
Mount Spivey, Alexander Island, Antarctica
Spivey, Kansas, United States, a city
Spivey Hall, on the campus of Clayton State University, Morrow, Georgia
Spivey's Corner, North Carolina, home of the National Hollerin' Contest, a hog calling contest

Other uses
Spivey Records, a specialist blues record label